The 2019–20 Tulsa Golden Hurricane men's basketball team represented the University of Tulsa during the 2019–20 NCAA Division I men's basketball season. The Golden Hurricane, led by sixth-year head coach Frank Haith, played their home games at the Reynolds Center in Tulsa, Oklahoma as members of the American Athletic Conference. They finished the season 21–10, 13–5 in AAC play to finish in a three-way tie for first place. Frank Haith was named AAC Coach of the Year for the season. Due to tiebreaking rules, they received the No. 3 seed in the AAC tournament, which was canceled due to the ongoing coronavirus pandemic. Shortly thereafter, the NCAA Tournament and all postseason tournaments were canceled, effectively ending Tulsa's season.

Previous season
The Golden Hurricane finished the 2018–19 season 18–14, 8–10 in AAC play to finish in a tie for seventh place. They lost in the first round of the AAC tournament to SMU.

Offseason

Departures

Incoming transfers

2019 recruiting class

2020 recruiting class

Roster

Schedule and results

|-
!colspan=9 style=| Exhibition

|-
!colspan=9 style=| Non-conference regular season

|-
!colspan=6 style=| AAC regular season

|-
!colspan=9 style=| AAC tournament

Source
1.Cancelled due to the Coronavirus Pandemic

Awards and honors

American Athletic Conference honors
Coach of the Year: Frank Haith
Sixth Man of the Year: Martins Igbanu

All-AAC First Team
Martins Igbanu

All-AAC Third Team
Brandon Rachal

Player of the Week
Week 2: Brandon Rachal
Week 11: Brandon Rachal
Week 12: Martins Igbanu
Week 13: Elijah Joiner

Source

References

2019–20 American Athletic Conference men's basketball season
2019-20
2020 in sports in Oklahoma
2019 in sports in Oklahoma